Banquo is an unincorporated community in Wayne Township, Huntington County, Indiana, United States.

History
Banquo was platted in 1906, but a village had existed at the site for some time prior.

References

Unincorporated communities in Huntington County, Indiana
Unincorporated communities in Indiana